Sistema Nohoch Nah Chich (from Spanish and Yucatec Maya meaning "Giant Birdcage System"), is located  south of Akumal in Tulum Municipality of Quintana Roo state, southeastern Mexico. It is part of the  underwater cave systems. 

It is an extensive water filled cave system connected with the Caribbean Sea, fed via a coastal spring in a cenote with a variety of names, including Cenote Manati, Cenote Tankah, and Casa Cenote after a nearby restaurant.

Sistema Nohoch Nah Chich was discovered to be connected to the Sistema Sac Actun, making the Sac Actun the longest surveyed underwater cave system in the world.

Exploration
For more than ten years the system was extensively explored by dedicated cave divers starting from Cenote Nohoch Nah Chich.  

In 1987 Mike Madden of CEDAM International Dive Center established the CEDAM Cave Diving Team principally to conduct annual exploration projects to focus on cave exploration, while a number of cave research efforts were logistically supported, with contributions in the fields of karst hydrogeology, water chemistry, microbiology, cave ecology, and underwater archaeology.

The technique of establishing jungle exploration camps at newly found cenotes and cave entrances of Sistema Nohoch Nah Chich was developed and refined during many cave exploration projects, thus allowing cave diving exploration effort to continue more efficiently at the edges of the known caves.

This portion of the system is now called the "Nohoch Nah Chich Historical section", where with  also the greatest depth of the entire system was reached at "The Blue Abyss".

See also

References 

 Steve Gerrard (2000); The Cenotes of the Riviera Maya (online version);  . retrieved January 14, 2011.

External links 
 Mike Madden Photos of Sistema Nohoch Nah Chich

Sistema Sac Actun and Sistema Dos Ojos
Caves of Mexico
Landforms of Quintana Roo
Limestone caves
Natural history of Quintana Roo
Tulum (municipality)
Tourist attractions in Quintana Roo
Underwater diving sites in Mexico